Dato' Sri Richard Riot anak Jaem (born 1 December 1951) is a Malaysian politician who has served as Special Envoy of the Prime Minister to East Asia in the Perikatan Nasional (PN) and Barisan Nasional (BN) administrations under Prime Ministers Muhyiddin Yassin and Ismail Sabri Yaakob since May 2020 and Member of Parliament (MP) for Serian since October 1990.  He served as Minister of Human Resources and Deputy Minister of Foreign Affairs in the BN administration under former Prime Minister Najib Razak and former Minister Anifah Aman from June 2010 to May 2018.   He is a member of the Sarawak United People's Party (SUPP), a component party of the Gabungan Parti Sarawak (GPS) coalition. He has also served Deputy President of SUPP since December 2011 and Chairman of the Sarawak Rivers Board (SRB).

Political career

Party posts 
During SUPP's triennial assembly in 2011, Riot was elected as the party's first non-Chinese deputy president.

Parliamentary career 
Riot first contested and won the Serian parliamentary seat in 1990 as an independent candidate. He was later re-elected for six consecutive terms beginning in 1995, all on a National Front (BN) ticket.

Ministerial career 
After serving for more than 20 years as a government backbencher, Riot was appointed as Deputy Minister of Foreign Affairs in a minor cabinet reshuffle on 1 June 2010.

In 2013 he was promoted to a full ministerial position as Minister for Human Resources.

Controversy 
After the 12th Malaysian general election in March 2008, there was speculation that Riot would defect to the opposition People's Justice Party (PKR); however, Riot denied the speculation and the move did not materialised.

In September 2017, Riot was engulfed in a corruption allegation after 40 million was found to be missing from the Skills Development Fund Corporation (SDFC) under the Ministry of Human Resources which he helmed as its minister. Among those arrested by the Malaysian Anti-Corruption Commission (MACC) included his political secretary. Riot himself was called in by the MACC and questioned for 10 hours.

Following the historic 14th Malaysian general election in May 2018 which saw the fall of the BN coalition from power, rumours swirled around with speculation that Riot was looking to, yet again, join the PKR, which was now a component party of the ruling Alliance of Hope (PH) coalition. This was denied by PKR Sarawak state liaison committee chairperson Baru Bian. Moreover, PH Sarawak chairperson, Chong Chieng Jen, advised his allied parties against accepting Riot in a statement declaring that his own, the Democratic Action Party (DAP), will not.

Less than a year later in February 2019, Riot was again surrounded by speculation that he may jump ship, this time to the United Sarawak Party (PSB) which is a splinter party of the SUPP.

On 29 February during the 2020 Malaysian political crisis, Riot was reported to have left SUPP to join PKR again. Somehow the inaccurate rumour was quickly quashed after a video clip of him denying the claims went viral the next day.

Election results

Honours 
  :
  Officer of the Order of the Defender of the Realm (KMN) (1997)
  Commander of the Order of Meritorious Service (PJN) - Datuk (2005)
  :
  Grand Knight of the Order of Sultan Ahmad Shah of Pahang (SSAP) - Dato' Sri (2013)
  :
  Knight Commander of the Order of the Star of Sarawak (PNBS) - Dato Sri (2017)

See also 
 Serian (federal constituency)

References 

Living people
1951 births
People from Sarawak
Bidayuh people
Sarawak United Peoples' Party politicians
Independent politicians in Malaysia
Members of the Dewan Rakyat
Government ministers of Malaysia
Commanders of the Order of Meritorious Service
Knights Commander of the Most Exalted Order of the Star of Sarawak
Officers of the Order of the Defender of the Realm
20th-century Malaysian politicians
21st-century Malaysian politicians